Joachim Ernst may refer to:

 Joachim Ernst, Duke of Anhalt (1901–1947), last ruler of the Duchy of Anhalt
 Joachim Ernst, Margrave of Brandenburg-Ansbach (1583–1625), German nobleman
 Joachim Ernst (ski jumper), German former ski jumper, father to Gianina Ernst